is a passenger railway station located in the city of Matsuyama, Ehime Prefecture, Japan. It is operated by JR Shikoku and has the station number "Y53".

Lines
Connections with other local or limited express trains are needed to travel further east or west along the line.

Layout
Iyo-Wake Station consists of two opposed side platforms serving two tracks. Line 1, served by platform 1, is the straight track and line 2, served by platform 2, is a passing loop. A station building linked to platform 1 houses a waiting room and an automatic ticket vending machine. Access to platform 2 is by means of a footbridge. Several sidings branch off line 2 while on the side of platform 1 are the traces of a disused freight platform.

Adjacent stations

History
At that time the station was operated by Japanese Government Railways, later becoming Japanese National Railways (JNR). With the privatization of JNR on 1 April 1987, control of the station passed to JR Shikoku.

Surrounding area
Taisen-ji, 52nd temple of the Shikoku Pilgrimage
 Enmyo-ji, 53rd temple of the Shikoku Pilgrimage
Shikoku Electric Power Matsuyama Solar Power Plant
Ehime Prefectural Matsuyama School for the Deaf

See also
 List of railway stations in Japan

References

External links
Station timetable

Railway stations in Ehime Prefecture
Railway stations in Japan opened in 1927
Railway stations in Matsuyama, Ehime